National Health is the first album recorded by the progressive rock and jazz fusion group National Health, one of the last representatives of the artistically prolific Canterbury scene. Although it was created during the rise of punk, the album is characterized by lengthy, elaborate and mostly instrumental compositions that combine prog and jazz elements.

Critical reception
In a retrospective review, All About Jazz wrote that "revisiting the disc over 30 years later reveals a strength in composition, improvisation and orchestration/arrangement that makes it another high point in the careers of everyone involved." In his History of Progressive Rock, Paul Stump said that National Health "retains an askew charm, dominated by a wheezy, rough-and-reedy sound at odds with the amniotic sybaritism of most Progressive production jobs at the time." He opined that despite the album having been criticized for "excessive compositional rigour", the elaborate and inventive compositions actually enabled the soloists to be more adventurous. The Billboard Guide to Progressive Music called the album "easily the best of [National Health's] three releases."

Track listing

Personnel
Phil Miller – electric guitar
Dave Stewart – acoustic piano, electric piano, organ (tracks 1, 2, 4, 5), Clavinet (track 3)
Pip Pyle – drums, glockenspiel (tracks 2, 5), pixiphone (track 5), gong (track 1), cowbell (track 1), tambourine (track 1), finger cymbals (track 2), shakers (track 2), bells (track 2)
Neil Murray – fretless bass guitar
with
Alan Gowen – acoustic piano (tracks 2, 5), electric piano, moog synthesizer
Jimmy Hastings – flute (tracks 1–3, 5), clarinet (tracks 3, 4), bass clarinet (track 1)
John Mitchell – percussion (track 1), güiro (track 2), temple block (track 2), conga (track 3)
Amanda Parsons – vocals (tracks 1, 2, 4, 5)

References

External links
National Health at Progarchives
Biography at Calyx Club
Discography
Gnosis website

National Health albums
1978 debut albums